Ove Hansen (29 November 1929 – 28 November 2007) was a Danish footballer. He played in nine matches for the Denmark national football team from 1956 to 1957.

References

External links
 

1929 births
2007 deaths
Danish men's footballers
Denmark international footballers
Place of birth missing
Association footballers not categorized by position